Sir Jagaddipendra Narayan Bhup Bahadur,  (15 December 1915 – 11 April 1970) was Maharaja of Cooch-Behar, in India. He served in British forces during World War II and ceded full ruling powers to the Government of India in 1949.

Early life 

He was born at Cooch Behar Palace as the eldest son of Maharaja Jitendra Narayan Bhup Bahadur, the Maharaja of Cooch-Behar, by his wife, Maharani Indira Devi Sahiba. He was informally known as 'Bhaiya' and was the brother of Gayatri Devi.

He was educated at St Cyprian's School, Eastbourne, Harrow and Trinity College, Cambridge, and also at the Prince of Wales Royal Indian Military College, Dehradun. He became the Maharaja of Cooch Behar at the age of seven on the death of his father on 20 December 1922 and ascended the gadi, on 24 December 1922. He reigned under the Regency of his mother until he came of age and was invested with full ruling powers on 6 April 1936. His close relatives stayed in Jaipur, Baroda, Dewas, Kota, Allahabad and Calcutta.

Personal life 

His first marriage took place privately at Cooch-Behar, 1949 to Nancy Valentine of New York, who was a former screen actress. A daughter was born but did not survive and the couple separated in 1952. His second marriage took place privately in London in 1956 to Georgina May Egan, . The marriage was made public in 1960, and his wife was recognised as Maharani together with the style of Her Highness in January 1960. Maharani Gina Narayan settled in Spain after 1980. She died there in 2013.

Military career 

He served with the British Army in World War II in North Africa, Assam, Burma, and South East Asia. He was present at the time of the Japanese surrender at Singapore in 1945. He was Chief Commandant Cooch-Behar Military forces from 1943 to 1949, and Colonel-in-Chief 1st Cooch-Behar Infantry and Rajendra Hazari Guards, Jaipur State Forces.

Political career 

He was a Member of the Standing Committee of the Chamber of Princes (Narendra Mandal).

He signed the instrument of accession to the Dominion of India in August 1947 and ceded full ruling powers to the Government of India on 12 September 1949, overseeing the merger of his state with West Bengal on 1 January 1950.

He died in Calcutta and was succeeded by his nephew, Virajendra Narayan, whom he adopted as a son.

Cricket 

He captained the Bengal Cricket XI.

Titles 
 1915–1922: Maharajkumar Sri Jagatdipendra Narayan
 1922–1939: His Highness Sri Sri Maharaja Jagatdipendra Narayan Bhup Bahadur, Maharaja of Cooch Behar
 1939–1942: 2nd Lieutenant His Highness Sri Sri Maharaja Jagatdipendra Narayan Bhup Bahadur, Maharaja of Cooch Behar
 1942–1944: Lieutenant His Highness Sri Sri Maharaja Jagatdipendra Narayan Bhup Bahadur, Maharaja of Cooch Behar
 1944–1945: Captain His Highness Sri Sri Maharaja Jagatdipendra Narayan Bhup Bahadur, Maharaja of Cooch Behar
 1945–1946: Major His Highness Sri Sri Maharaja Jagatdipendra Narayan Bhup Bahadur, Maharaja of Cooch Behar
 1946–1947: Lieutenant-Colonel His Highness Sri Sri Maharaja Jagatdipendra Narayan Bhup Bahadur, Maharaja of Cooch Behar
 1947–1970: Colonel His Highness Sri Sri Maharaja Sir Jagatdipendra Narayan Bhup Bahadur, Maharaja of Cooch Behar, KCIE

Honours 

(ribbon bar, as it would look today, incomplete)

 King George V Silver Jubilee Medal – 1935
 King George VI Coronation Medal – 1937
 1939–1945 Star – 1945
 Burma Star – 1945
 Africa Star – 1945
 Pacific Star – 1945
 War Medal 1939–1945 – 1945
 India Service Medal – 1945
 Knight Commander of the Order of the Indian Empire (KCIE) – 1947
 Indian Independence Medal – 1947
 Queen Elizabeth II Coronation Medal – 1953

See also 
Royal State Transport (Now "North Bengal State Transport Corporation")

North Bengal State Transport Corporation (NBSTC) is a West Bengal state government undertaken transport corporation. It plys buses in North Bengal and other parts of West Bengal to Kolkata. NBSTC owns many depots in West Bengal to station their buses.This organisation was inaugurated by the then King of Cooch behar His Highness Jagaddipendra Narayan Bhup Bahadur Lt.Col. in a bright sunny 1 April morning in the year 1945.Started with three buses and trucks; initially operated "Royal Mail" service and slowly introduced its passenger version to Mansai Ghat,Burnish Ghat,Alipurduar,Tufangaunge etc.The vehicles were of 'Thames and Chevrolet'make,later came 'Ford' makes.Thanks to the far farsightedness of erstwhile rulers, this organisation provided and still providing lively hood and means of transport. To scores of peoples of North Bengal Region and lower Assam.As a matter of fact it is most probably the oldest STU in India.NBSTC received national productivity award in the year 1996.It is deeply weaved with the social,financial, cultural life of the peoples of this region.No other organisation,no matter how strong it is? Can barely match with NBSTC,in terms of impact on life of the peoples of this region.

 Koch dynasty

References

External links
 History Book of Cooch Behar
 Further information

1915 births
1970 deaths
Alumni of Trinity College, Cambridge
Bengal cricketers
Hindu monarchs
Knights Commander of the Order of the Indian Empire
Maharajas of Koch Bihar
People educated at Harrow School
People educated at St Cyprian's School
Indian knights
Indian cricketers
Cricketers from West Bengal
People from Cooch Behar district